Conocybe intrusa is a species of fungus belonging to the family Bolbitiaceae.

It is native to Europe and Northern America.

References

Bolbitiaceae